A Concerto Is a Conversation is a 2021 American documentary film directed by Ben Proudfoot and Kris Bowers.

Summary
The 13-minute film centers on Bowers's conversations with his jazz pianist grandfather about personal and family history.

Production
Filmmaker Ava DuVernay is an executive producer on this film.

Accolades
It was nominated for the Academy Award for Best Documentary Short Subject at the 93rd Academy Awards.

See also
Jim Crow
Walt Disney Concert Hall

References

External links
A Concerto Is a Conversation at The New York Times
 

2021 films
2021 short documentary films
American documentary films
Documentary films about African Americans
Jazz films
2020s English-language films
2020s American films
Works originally published in The New York Times